In quantum geometry or noncommutative geometry a quantum differential calculus or noncommutative differential structure on an algebra  over a field  means the specification of a space of differential forms over the algebra.  The algebra  here is regarded as a coordinate ring but it is important that it may be noncommutative and hence not an actual algebra of coordinate functions on any actual space, so this represents a point of view replacing the specification of a differentiable structure for an actual space. In ordinary differential geometry one can multiply differential 1-forms by functions from the left and from the right, and there exists an exterior derivative.  Correspondingly, a first order quantum differential calculus means at least the following:

1.

 .

2. A linear map  obeying the Leibniz rule
 

3. 

4. (optional connectedness condition) 

The last condition is not always imposed but holds in ordinary geometry when the manifold is connected.

 

The product of differential forms is called the exterior or wedge product and often denoted . The noncommutative or quantum de Rham cohomology is defined as the cohomology of this complex.

A higher order differential calculus can mean an exterior algebra, or it can mean the partial specification of one, up to some highest degree, and with products that would result in a degree beyond the highest being unspecified.

The above definition lies at the crossroads of two approaches to noncommutative geometry. In the Connes approach a more fundamental object is a replacement for the Dirac operator in the form of a spectral triple, and an exterior algebra can be constructed from this data. In the quantum groups approach to noncommutative geometry one starts with the algebra and a choice of first order calculus but constrained by covariance under a quantum group symmetry.

Note
The above definition is minimal and gives something more general than classical differential calculus even when the algebra  is commutative or functions on an actual space. This is because we do not demand that

 

since this would imply that , which would violate axiom 4 when the algebra was noncommutative. As a byproduct, this enlarged definition includes finite difference calculi and quantum differential calculi on finite sets and finite groups (finite group Lie algebra theory).

Examples
1.

 

This shows how finite differences arise naturally in quantum geometry. Only the limit  has functions commuting with 1-forms, which is the special case of high school differential calculus.

2.

 

This shows how -differentials arise naturally in quantum geometry.

3. For any algebra  one has a universal differential calculus defined by

 

where  is the algebra product. By axiom 3., any first order calculus is a quotient of this.

See also
Quantum geometry
Noncommutative geometry
Quantum calculus
Quantum group
Quantum spacetime

Further reading

Noncommutative geometry
Algebraic structures